Damien Irwin (born 23 May 1969) is an Irish hurling manager and former player who played for East Cork club Killeagh. He played for the Cork senior hurling team for two seasons, during which time he usually lined out as a left wing-back.

Honours

Killeagh
Cork Intermediate Hurling Championship (1): 2001
Cork Junior Hurling Championship (1): 1995
East Cork Junior A Hurling Championship (2): 1998, 1995

Imokilly
Cork Senior Hurling Championship (2): 1997, 1998

Cork
All-Ireland Senior Hurling Championship (1): 1990
Munster Senior Hurling Championship (1): 1990
All-Ireland Under-21 Hurling Championship (1): 1988
Munster Under-21 Hurling Championship (1): 1988
Munster Minor Hurling Championship (1): 1986

References

1969 births
Living people
Killeagh hurlers
Imokilly hurlers
Cork inter-county hurlers
Hurling managers